Will Denton (born February 4, 1990) is an American film and television actor.

Best known for playing the role of Leopold Cain in the television series Kidnapped (2006), his credits also include  the films Robots (2005), Palindromes (2004), Kinsey (2004), and The Post (2017).

Denton attended Johns Hopkins University in Baltimore, Maryland. 

He appeared in Camp Hope, a horror film starring Dana Delany (his on-screen mother in Kidnapped).

Other television credits include Law & Order and Ed.

His latest film appearance was a minor role in the 2017 political thriller The Post starring Meryl Streep and Tom Hanks.

He also studied philosophy, politics and economics at Hertford College, Oxford as an American visiting student.

Denton is a founder of a NYC based design and technology company Channel Studio that has completed projects for The New York Times, Microsoft, Nobel Foundation  , amongst others since its inception in 2017.

Filmography

References

External links

1990 births
Living people
American male film actors
American male television actors
People from Brookfield, Connecticut